Damn Citizen is a 1958 American film noir crime film directed by Robert Gordon and starring Keith Andes, Margaret Hayes and Gene Evans.

Plot
A former WWII hero is appointed head of the state police by the governor of Louisiana to eliminate corruption in 1952.

Cast
 Keith Andes as Col. Francis C. Grevemberg  
 Margaret Hayes as Dorothy Grevemberg (as Maggie Hayes)
 Gene Evans as Maj. Al Arthur  
 Lynn Bari as Pat Noble  
 Jeffrey Stone as Paul Musso  
 Edward Platt as Joseph Kosta (as Edward C. Platt)
 Ann Robinson as Cleo  
 Sam Buffington as DeButts  
 Clegg Hoyt as Sheriff Lloyd  
 Kendall Clark as Col. Tom Hastings  
 Rusty Lane as Police Sweeney  
 Charles Horvath as Lt. Palmer  
 Carolyn Kearney as Nancy  
 Mr. Aaron M. Kohn as Himself  
 REV. Dr. J. D. Grey as  Himself
 Mr. Richard R. Foster as  Himself  
 Pershing Gervais as Big Jim  
 Aaron A. Edgecombe as Major Sterling
 Robert H. Jamieson as Capt. Desmond (as Rev. Robert Jamieson)
 Paul Hostetler as Father Masters (as Paul S. Hostetler)
 Nathaniel F. Oddo as Thomas Gleason
 Dudley C. Foley Jr. as Fowler
 Charles A. Murphy as Judge 
 George Trussell as Harry (as George M. Trussell)
 Jack Dempsey as Reporter 
 Frank Hay as Reporter
 Tiger Flowers as News Commentator
 Martin N. Fritcher as Townsman
 Packie McFarland as Townsman
 James F. Cottingham as Townsman

See also
 List of American films of 1958

References

External links
 
 
 

1958 films
Film noir
1958 crime films
American crime films
Universal Pictures films
Films directed by Robert Gordon
1950s English-language films
1950s American films
English-language crime films